Don Bosco Football Club de Pétion-Ville is a professional football club based in Pétion-Ville, Haiti.

The club won their first Haitian championship in 1971, and second in 2003, winning the league's Ouverture.

Honours
Ligue Haïtienne: 5
 1971, 2003 O, 2014 C, 2015 O, 2018 C

International competitions
CONCACAF Champions League: 2 appearances
1972 – Second round - withdrew
2016–17 – Group Stage - 3rd in Group D

Current squad
Nationality given from place of birth

Crests

References

Football clubs in Haiti
Pétion-Ville
Association football clubs established in 1963
1963 establishments in Haiti